"One man, one vote", or "one person, one vote", expresses the principle of equal representation in voting. This slogan is used by advocates of democracy and political equality, especially with regard to electoral reforms like universal suffrage and proportional representation.

Indices 
The violation of equal representation in the various systems of proportional representation can be measured with the Loosemore–Hanby index, the Gallagher index or the amount of unrepresented vote. A Gallagher index above 5 (%) is seen by many experts as violating the One man, one vote principle. In case of plurality voting, the wasted vote can be measured. Additionally, the percentage of spoilt vote and percentage of disfranchisement can be measured to detect violations of the equal representation principle.

History 
The phrase surged in english-language usage around 1880, thanks in part to British trade unionist George Howell who used the phrase "one man, one vote" in political pamphlets. During the mid-to-late 20th-century period of decolonisation and the struggles for national sovereignty, this phrase became widely used in developing countries where majority populations sought to gain political power in proportion to their numbers. The slogan was notably used by the anti-apartheid movement during the 1980s, which sought to end white minority rule in South Africa.

In the United States, the "one person, one vote" principle was invoked in a series of cases by the Warren Court in the 1960s during the height of related civil rights activities. Applying the Equal Protection Clause of the constitution, the U.S. Supreme Court majority opinion (5–4) led by Chief Justice Earl Warren in Reynolds v. Sims (1964) ruled that state legislatures, unlike the U.S. Congress, needed to have representation in both houses that was based on districts containing roughly equal populations, with redistricting as needed after censuses. Some had an upper house based on an equal number of representatives to be elected from each county, which gave undue political power to rural counties. Many states had neglected to redistrict for decades during the 20th century, even as population increased in urban, industrialized areas. In the 1964 Wesberry v. Sanders decision, the U.S. Supreme Court declared that equality of voting—one person, one vote—means that "the weight and worth of the citizens' votes as nearly as is practicable must be the same", and ruled that states must also draw federal congressional districts containing roughly equal represented populations.

United Kingdom

Historical background 
This phrase was traditionally used in the context of demands for suffrage reform. Historically the emphasis within the House of Commons was on representing areas: counties, boroughs and, later on, universities. The entitlement to vote for the Members of Parliament representing the constituencies varied widely, with different qualifications over time, such as owning property of a certain value, holding an apprenticeship, qualifying for paying the local-government rates, or holding a degree from the university in question. Those who qualified for the vote in more than one constituency were entitled to vote in each constituency, while many adults did not qualify for the vote at all. Plural voting was also present in local government, whereby the owners of business property qualified for votes in the relevant wards.

Reformers argued that Members of Parliament and other elected officials should represent citizens equally, and that each voter should be entitled to exercise the vote once in an election. Successive Reform Acts by 1950 had both extended the franchise eventually to almost all adult citizens (barring convicts, lunatics and members of the House of Lords), and also reduced and finally eliminated plural voting for Westminster elections. Plural voting for local-government elections outside the City of London was not abolished until the Representation of the People Act 1969.

But, there were two significant exceptions:

City of London 
The City of London had never expanded its boundaries. Following the replacement of many residential dwellings by businesses, and the destruction of The Blitz, after the Second World War, the financial district had barely five thousand residents. The system of plural voting was retained for electing the City of London Corporation, with some modifications.

Northern Ireland 
When Northern Ireland was established in 1921, it adopted the same political system then in place for the Westminster Parliament and British local government. But the Parliament of Northern Ireland did not follow Westminster in changes to the franchise from 1945. As a result, into the 1960s, plural voting was still allowed not only for local government (as it was for local government in Great Britain), but also for the Parliament of Northern Ireland. This meant that in local council elections (as in Great Britain), ratepayers and their spouses, whether renting or owning the property, could vote. Company directors had an extra vote by virtue of their company's status. However, unlike the situation in Great Britain, non-ratepayers did not have a vote in local government elections. The franchise for elections to the Parliament of Northern Ireland had been extended in 1928 to all adult citizens who were not disqualified, at the same time as the franchise for elections to Westminster. But, university representation and the business vote continued for elections to the House of Commons of Northern Ireland until 1969. They were abolished in 1948 for elections to the UK House of Commons (including Westminster seats in Northern Ireland). Historians and political scholars have debated the extent to which the franchise for local government contributed to unionist electoral success in controlling councils in nationalist-majority areas.

Based on a number of inequities, the Northern Ireland Civil Rights Association was founded in 1967. It had five primary demands, and added the demand that each citizen in Northern Ireland be afforded the same number of votes for local government elections (as stated above, this was not yet the case anywhere in the United Kingdom). The slogan "one man, one vote" became a rallying cry for this campaign. The Parliament of Northern Ireland voted to update the voting rules for elections to the Northern Ireland House of Commons, which were implemented for the 1969 Northern Ireland general election, and for local government elections, which was done by the Electoral Law Act (Northern Ireland) 1969, passed on 25 November 1969.

United States

Historical background 

The United States Constitution requires a decennial census for the purpose of assuring fair apportionment of seats in the United States House of Representatives among the states, based on their population. Reapportionment has generally been conducted without incident with the exception of the reapportionment that should have followed the 1920 Census, which was effectively skipped pending resolution by the Reapportionment Act of 1929.  State legislatures, however, initially established election of congressional representatives from districts that were often based on traditional counties or parishes that had preceded founding of the new government. The question then arose as to whether the legislatures were required to ensure that House districts were roughly equal in population and to draw new districts to accommodate demographic changes.

Some U.S. states redrew their House districts every ten years to reflect changes in population patterns; many did not. Some never redrew them, except when it was mandated by reapportionment of Congress and a resulting change in the number of seats to which that state was entitled in the House of Representatives. In many states, both North and South, this inaction resulted in a skewing of influence for voters in some districts over those in others, generally with a bias toward rural districts. For example, if the 2nd congressional district eventually had a population of 1.5 million, but the 3rd had only 500,000, then, in effect – since each district elected the same number of representatives – a voter in the 3rd district had three times the voting power of a 2nd-district voter. 

Alabama's state legislature resisted redistricting from 1910 to 1972 (when forced by federal court order). As a result, rural residents retained a wildly disproportionate amount of power in a time when other areas of the state became urbanized and industrialized, attracting greater populations. Such urban areas were under-represented in the state legislature and underserved; their residents had difficulty getting needed funding for infrastructure and services. Such areas paid far more in taxes to the state than they received in benefits in relation to the population.

The Constitution incorporates the result of the Great Compromise,  which established representation for the U.S. Senate. Each state was equally represented in the Senate with two representatives, without regard to population. The Founding Fathers considered this principle of such importance that they included a clause in the Constitution to prohibit any state from being deprived of equal representation in the Senate without its permission; see Article V of the United States Constitution. For this reason, "one person, one vote" has never been implemented in the U.S. Senate, in terms of representation by states.

When states established their legislatures, they often adopted a bicameral model based on colonial governments or the federal government. Many copied the Senate principle, establishing an upper house based on geography - for instance, a state senate with one representative drawn from each county. By the 20th century, this often resulted in state senators having widely varying amounts of political  power, with ones from rural areas having votes equal in power to those of senators representing much greater urban populations.

Activism in the Civil Rights Movement to restore the ability of African Americans in the South to register and vote highlighted other voting inequities across the country. In 1964–1965, the Civil Rights Act of 1964 and Voting Rights Act of 1965 were passed, in part to enforce the constitutional voting rights of African Americans. Numerous court challenges were raised, including in Alabama, due to the lack of reapportionment for decades.

Court cases 
In  the United States Supreme Court held in a 4-3 plurality decision that Article I, Section 4 left to the legislature of each state the authority to establish the time, place, and manner of holding elections for representatives.

However, in  the United States Supreme Court under Chief Justice Earl Warren overturned the previous decision in Colegrove holding that malapportionment claims under the Equal Protection Clause of the Fourteenth Amendment were not exempt from judicial review under Article IV, Section 4, as the equal protection issue in this case was separate from any political questions.

, said states may use total population in drawing districts.

Other uses 
 In 1975, a Michigan court ruling declared that "majority preferential voting," as IRV was then known, did not violate the one-man, one-vote rule:
Under the 'M.P.V. System', however, no one person or voter has more than one effective vote for one office. No voter's vote can be counted more than once for the same candidate. In the final analysis, no voter is given greater weight in his or her vote over the vote of another voter, although to understand this does require a conceptual understanding of how the effect of a 'M.P.V. System' is like that of a run-off election. The form of majority preferential voting employed in the City of Ann Arbor's election of its Mayor does not violate the one-man, one-vote mandate nor does it deprive anyone of equal protection rights under the Michigan or United States Constitutions.
 The constitutionality of IRV has been subsequently upheld by several federal courts. In 2018, a federal court ruled on the constitutionality of Maine’s use of ranked-choice voting, stating that "'one person, one vote' does not stand in opposition to ranked balloting, so long as all electors are treated equally at the ballot."
Training Wheels for Citizenship, a failed 2004 initiative in California, attempted to give minors between 14 and 17 years of age (who otherwise cannot vote) a fractional vote in state elections. Among the criticisms leveled at the proposed initiative was that it violated the "one man, one vote" principle.
The courts have found that special-purpose districts must also follow the one person, one vote rule.
Due to treaties signed by the United States in 1830 and 1835, two Native American tribes (the Cherokee and Choctaw) each hold the right to a non-voting delegate position in the House of Representatives. As of 2019, only the Cherokee have attempted to exercise that right. Because all tribal governments related to the two in question exist within present-day state boundaries, it has been suggested that such an arrangement could potentially violate the "one man, one vote" principle by granting a "super-vote"; a Cherokee or Choctaw voter would have two House representatives (state and tribal), whereas any other American would only have one.

Developing countries

Successful examples 
The "one man, one vote" election system has been successfully implemented in many developing countries, most notably India and South Africa.

Reforms thwarted 
The term "One man, one vote, one time" has been applied to Zimbabwe, Zambia, Angola, Belarus and Russia where representative elections were successfully held that were relatively free of corruption and violence. In each case, a strongman came to power and effectively ended free and equitable voting.

See also
One vote, one value: a similar principle in Australia
Proportional representation
Democratization
Democracy Index
Universal suffrage
Electoral College
Panachage: a system where each voter casts multiple votes, although each voter can still be equally represented

Notes

References

Suffrage
Political catchphrases
Democracy
United States One Person, One Vote Legal Doctrine
Principles